The 1987 Intercontinental Final was the thirteenth running of the Intercontinental Final as part of the qualification for the 1987 Speedway World Championship. The 1987 Final was run on 26 July at the Speedway Center in Vojens, Denmark, and was the last qualifying stage for riders from Scandinavia, the USA and from the Commonwealth nations for the World Final to be held at the Amsterdam Olympic Stadium in the Netherlands.

Intercontinental Final
 26 July
  Vojens, Speedway Center
 Qualification: Top 11 plus 1 reserve to the World Final in Amsterdam, Netherlands

References

See also
 Motorcycle Speedway

1987
World Individual